Dominic Callan (born 20 September 1966) was a Scottish footballer who played for Dumbarton and Queen's Park. He now coaches a youth team, St.Cadocs Thistle.

References

1966 births
Scottish footballers
Dumbarton F.C. players
Queen's Park F.C. players
Scottish Football League players
Living people
Association football fullbacks